Lysandre Ménard (born 1993 in Boucherville, Quebec) is a Canadian actress and musician. She is most noted for her performance in the 2015 film The Passion of Augustine (La Passion d'Augustine), for which she was a Quebec Cinema Award nominee for Best Supporting Actress at the 18th Quebec Cinema Awards in 2016, and her 2022 album Sans oublier, which was a Félix Award nominee for Alternative Album of the Year at the 44th Félix Awards in 2022.

She uses her full name when acting, but is mononymously billed as Lysandre in her music.

She has also appeared in the film Of Ink and Blood (D'Encre et de sang), and the television series Chaos.

References

External links

1993 births
Living people
21st-century Canadian actresses
21st-century Canadian pianists
21st-century Canadian women singers
Canadian film actresses
Canadian television actresses
Canadian women singer-songwriters
Canadian pop singers
Canadian pop pianists
French Quebecers
Actresses from Quebec
Singers from Quebec
People from Boucherville